The McAdams House is a historic house at Maple and South Streets in Pangburn, Arkansas.  It is a single-story wood-frame structure, with a hip roof that has long and slightly flared eaves with exposed rafter tails.  It is clad in novelty siding and rests on a foundation of stone piers.  Built about 1915, it is one of the few well-preserved houses in White County from that time period.

The house was listed on the National Register of Historic Places in 1991.

See also
National Register of Historic Places listings in White County, Arkansas

References

Houses on the National Register of Historic Places in Arkansas
Houses completed in 1915
Houses in White County, Arkansas
National Register of Historic Places in White County, Arkansas
1915 establishments in Arkansas